Tomaž Nose (born 21 April 1982) is a Slovenian retired racing cyclist.

Major results

2000
 5th Road race, UCI Road World Championships
2002
 2nd Overall GP Kranj
 4th Overall Istrian Spring Trophy
 5th Road race, UEC European Under-23 Road Championships
 5th Trofeo Zsšdi
2003
 2nd Overall GP Tell
1st Stage 2
 3rd Giro del Belvedere
 3rd Overall Giro delle Regioni
 9th Overall Istrian Spring Trophy
2004
 1st  Overall GP Tell
1st Stage 2
 1st GP Palio del Recioto
 1st Stage 6 Tour de Slovénie
 2nd Giro del Belvedere
 7th Trofeo Piva
2006
 1st  Overall Tour de Slovénie
1st Stages 2 & 3
 2nd Road race, National Road Championships
 10th Overall Giro del Trentino
2007
 1st  Overall Tour de Slovénie
 2nd Road race, National Road Championships
 8th Overall Brixia Tour
2009
 2nd Overall Tour de Slovénie
 6th GP Industria & Artigianato
2010
 6th GP Industria & Artigianato
2011
 6th Memoriał Henryka Łasaka
2012
 3rd GP Nobili Rubinetterie
 6th Trofeo Zsšdi
 9th Overall Tour de Slovénie
2013
 3rd Classic Beograd–Cacak
 6th Raiffeisen Grand Prix
 8th Overall Settimana Ciclistica Lombarda

External links 

1982 births
Living people
Slovenian male cyclists